Choi Hung Road Playground is located in Choi Hung Road, San Po Kong, Wong Tai Sin District, Kowloon, Hong Kong. The playground is managed by the Leisure and Cultural Services Department of Hong Kong.

History 
Choi Hung Road Playground was built by the Urban Council and opened on 14 July 1964 by Urban Councillor Elsie Elliott. The park was later expanded to occupy the site formerly occupied by the adjacent Kai Tak Amusement Park. In the 1980s, a new gymnasium, market and cooking centre were built.

Facilities 
Hockey stadium
Soccer field
Park pavilion
Peak park
Observation deck
Tennis court
Handball court
Basketball court
Badminton centre
Rooftop tennis court
Gymnasium
Market
Cooking centre
Chess benches
Elderly fitness station
Fountain

Opening hours 
The park is opened to the general public from 7:00am to 11:00pm

Public transport 
Choi Hung Road Park is within 10 minutes of walking distance from the Wong Tai Sin station and the Diamond Hill station of the MTR. One can also go to Choi Hung Road Park by boarding a bus or minibus which passes by Choi Hung Road.

References

External links

 康樂及文化署的官方網站 (繁體中文)
 1972年：啟德遊樂場的影像
 2008年11月：亞洲戲院及國寶戲院的遺址的影像
 2008年11月：啟德遊樂場的遺址的影像

Urban public parks and gardens in Hong Kong
1964 establishments in Hong Kong
San Po Kong